Hắc Dịch is a ward of Phú Mỹ town, Bà Rịa–Vũng Tàu province, in Vietnam.

Populated places in Bà Rịa-Vũng Tàu province
Communes of Bà Rịa-Vũng Tàu province